"Rise" is the 61st episode of Star Trek: Voyager, the 19th episode of the third season. The episode debuted on February 26, 1997 on UPN. This episode focuses on the characters Neelix and Tuvok on an away mission. It was written by Brannon Braga from a story by Jimmy Diggs, and directed by Robert Scheerer.

In the 24th century, two crewmembers of a starship try to help aliens, but when their shuttlecraft crashes, they must evacuate by space elevator. However, on the journey up they encounter unexpected difficulties with the aliens they are trying to help, even as they try to manage their own relationship.

Overview 
The story by Jimmy Diggs was inspired by the 1965 film The Flight of the Phoenix.

This episode is noted for being set on space elevator.

Guest stars:

 Alan Oppenheimer as Nezu Ambassador
 Lisa Kaminir as Lillias
 Kelly Connell as Sklar
 Tom Towles as Doctor Vatm
 Geof Prysirr as Hanjuan
 Gary Bullock as Goth

Plot
Voyager helps a planet with asteroid problems. Dr Vatm contacts Voyager and starts to explain that the asteroids are not what they seem, but the connection is cut short. Tuvok and Neelix were assigned to look for Dr Vatm but due to atmospheric turbulence, their Shuttle crash-lands on the planet. Dr Vatm and Hanjuan find the Shuttle and they ponder how to contact Voyager. In the distance, Neelix sees the Maglev and suggests it as a way out. They attempt to fix a maglev space elevator. Several problems arise due to other aliens stuck aboard the elevator as well. Neelix and Tuvok find they must figure out which of the aliens is hostile.
During this episode Neelix confronts Tuvok about his supercilious attitude, and the two reach more of an understanding.

Reception 
In 2004, Trek Today said that "Tim Russ and Ethan Phillips did a terrific job holding interest" and that it worked as a relationship episode. They point it was also action story, but with a "cliched but sweet learning to get along" story for Tuvok and Neelix.

In a review in 2020 by Tor.com, they said this episode was good as a stand-alone Voyager episode, with a great science fiction concept (the space tether) and some action. However, they had some reservations about the dynamics between Tuvok and Neelix after "Fair Trade" and "Tuvix". Overall they gave the episode 5 out of 10.

In 2021, Comic Book Resources highlighted "Rise" as an example of an ambitious episode in season 3 that presented "reliable sci-fi concepts in new and interesting ways".

Media releases 
This episode was released on DVD on July 6, 2004 as part of Star Trek Voyager: Complete Third Season, with Dolby 5.1 surround audio. The season 3 DVD was released in the UK on September 6, 2004.

In 2017, the complete Star Trek: Voyager television series was released in a DVD box set , which included it as part of the season 3 discs.

References

External links

 

Star Trek: Voyager (season 3) episodes
1997 American television episodes
Television episode directed by Robert Scheerer
Television episodes written by Brannon Braga